The Kallakurichi block is a revenue block in the Kallakurichi district of Tamil Nadu, India. It has a total of 46 panchayat villages.

References 
 

Revenue blocks of Kallakurichi district